Jaiswal or Jayswal or Jayaswal is a surname used by many Hindu communities. Jaiswals are mainly traders and deal in various commodities. In past, some of them  excelled in the art of liquor making.

History 
The origin of the Jaiswal community is not known, but it is speculated that their ancestors hailed from town 'Jais' in Uttar Pradesh and came to known as Jaiswals. They are mostly found in North India including Agra, Delhi and Rajasthan.

In 2003, Jaiswal Kalwars were classified and listed as an Other Backward Class by some state governments like Delhi & Uttar Pradesh, although Jaiswal Jain and Rajput still belong to General Category in India's reservation system.

Prominent Jaiswal Jains 

 Ravindra Jain, poet and music director

Prominent Jaiswal Kalwars 
 Ankush Jaiswal (cricketer)
 Madan Prasad Jaiswal (Indian politician)
 Naina Jaiswal (table tennis player)
 Pankaj Jaiswal (cricketer)
 Pradeep Jaiswal (Maharastra politician)
 Pragya Jaiswal (actress and model)
 Radhey Shyam Jaisawal (UP politician)
 Rahul Jaiswal (Indian footballer)
 Samiksha Jaiswal (TV actress)
 Sanjeev Jaiswal (actor)
 Sanjiv Jaiswal (film director and producer)
 Shankar Prasad Jaiswal (Indian politician)
 Shreyansh Jaiswal (badminton player)
 Rajaram Shastri (Indian educationist and politician)
 Rajani Rai (former lieutenant governor of Puducherry)
 Sanjaya Lall (prominent world economist)
 Suvira Jaiswal (Indian historian)
 Yashasvi Jaiswal (Indian cricketer)

Prominent Jaiswal Rajputs 
 Anantram Jaiswal (Freedom fighter and founder of Samajwadi Party) 
 Dilip Kumar Jaiswal (Indian politician)
 Jawahar Lal Jaiswal (Indian politician)
 GCR Jaiswal (Vice Chancellor, Awadh University)
 Gorakh Prasad Jaiswal (Indian politician)
 Navin Jaiswal (Jharkhand politician)
 Ravindra Jaiswal (UP politician)
 Rai Bahadur Thakur Jaiswal (Jharkhand businessperson)
 Ritu Jaiswal (Bihar Politician)
 Sanjay Jaiswal (Indian politician)
 Saligram Jaiswal (freedom fighter and politician)
 Sriprakash Jaiswal (Indian politician)

See also 
 Jaiswal Jain

 Kalwar (caste)
 Rajput

References 

 Bayly, Christopher A. (1973). Patrons and Politics in Northern India. In Gallagher, John; Johnson, Gordon; Seal, Anil. Locality, Province and Nation: Essays on Indian Politics 1870 to 1940 (Reprinted ed.). Cambridge University Press Archive. p. 63. .
K. S. Singh (1996). People of India: Delhi. P. 264, India: Anthropological Survey of India.
  page 438
Smita Tewari Jassal (2001). Daughters of the earth: women and land in Uttar Pradesh. .

Indian surnames
Brewing and distilling castes
Other Backward Classes
Indian castes
Social groups of Uttar Pradesh
Surnames of Indian origin
People from Amethi district
Surnames of Hindustani origin
Hindu surnames